Sean William Ghazi (born 4 April 1969, in Kuala Lumpur, Malaysia) is a Malaysian actor, singer and dancer.

Career 
Ghazi is best known for appearing in the 1999 movie Anna and the King(in the role of Balat), alongside Jodie Foster and Chow Yun-fat. He has appeared on stage in London's West End and in Europe, in productions such as Miss Saigon, Rent and The King and I. He has also appeared in several television and theatre productions in Asia.

In 2006, Ghazi released his first music album, Semalam, which features jazzed-up versions of classic Malay songs. One of the album's feature songs "Ku Impikan Bintang", a Malay-language rendition of Pink Martini's "Let's Never Stop Falling in Love", became a popular hit. The album earned Ghazi the 'Best New Artiste' award at the Anugerah Industri Muzik at the same year..

In 1995, Ghazi won a nationally-televised talent competition in Singapore called the Fame Awards.

Ghazi was educated at the United World College of South East Asia in Singapore, Emerson College in Boston, and Laine Theatre Arts in London.

Filmography

Discography
 Sean Ghazi Semalam (2006)

Awards

Anugerah Industri Muzik
 2006: Best New Artiste

Theatre Works
 P. Ramlee – The Musical (2007)

References

External links 
 

1969 births
Living people
Malaysian male actors
Malaysian male pop singers
Malaysian classical musicians
Malay-language singers
People educated at a United World College